The Gulf of Riga, Bay of Riga, or Gulf of Livonia is a bay of the Baltic Sea between Latvia and Estonia.

The island of Saaremaa (Estonia) partially separates it from the rest of the Baltic Sea. The main connection between the gulf and the Baltic Sea is the Irbe Strait.

The Gulf of Riga, as a sub-basin of the Baltic, also includes the Väinameri Sea in the West Estonian archipelago.

Geography

Extent 

The International Hydrographic Organization defines the Gulf of Riga's western limit as "A line running from Lyser Ort (57°34'N), in Latvia, to the South extreme of Œsel Island, through this island to Pammerort (22°34'E), thence to Enmast Point, the S extreme of Dagö, through Dagö to Takhkona Point, the North extreme thereof, and on to Spithamn Point in Estonia".

Islands 
Major islands in the gulf include Saaremaa, Kihnu, and Ruhnu, which are all controlled by Estonia. Saaremaa island is responsible for the brackish water of the Gulf of Riga, as it is partially "shielded" from the Baltic Sea. The Baltic itself is already less salty than the global oceanic average, but this effect has a North-South and East-West gradient.

Cities 
Notable cities around the gulf include Riga, Pärnu, Jūrmala, and Kuressaare. The main rivers flowing into the gulf are Daugava, Pärnu, Lielupe, Gauja, and Salaca.

Salinity
The freshwater runoff entering the Baltic sea accounts for two percent of its volume. A narrow connection to the North Sea means that water stays in the Baltic for an average of 30 years. These two characteristics work to make the Baltic Sea one of the largest brackish bodies of water in the world. The Gulf of Riga has an average salt concentration for the Baltic Sea, which is around six to ten parts per thousand. Freshwater has a concentration of 0.5 parts per thousand, and seawater is about 30 parts per thousand.

Winter
In winter, most or all of the Bay occasionally freezes. This is due to low salinity and the calming effect of the partial closure of the entrance of the gulf. During the winter, many people walk over the bay. Ice hole fishing has been a traditional source of winter food, and remains a common activity. The ice usually melts between March and April. In late March 2013, when the ice started to melt, 200 people had to be rescued from ice floes.

See also
 Battle of the Gulf of Riga
 Pärnu Bay

References

External links

The Gulf of Riga  (Estonica)

 
Geography of Northern Europe
Landforms of Pärnu County
Landforms of Saare County
Estonia–Latvia border